Chengannur Mahadeva Temple (also called Bhagavathy Temple) is a prominent Hindu temple, dedicated to Shiva and located in the town of Chengannur in the South Indian state of Kerala. The temple is one of the major Shiva temples in Kerala counted along with the  Ettumanoor Mahadevar Temple, Kaduthruthy Mahadeva Temple, Vaikom Temple, Ernakulam Shiva Temple and Vadakkunathan temple. There are shrines for Ganesha, Dakshinamurthy, Subramanya, Sastha, Krishna, Nilagriva, Sthalisha, Hanuman, Ganga and Serpent deities inside and outside the temple complex.

The temple is popularly counted as one of the major Bhagavathy temples in Kerala. The temple celebrates a rare menstruation festival for Bhagavathy, called Thripputhu, during when the temple is closed for three days during the irregular menstruation of the deity. There are five daily poojas done in temple, three Sarabalies for Shiva and three for Bhagavathy. Tantric worship is done by Thazhaman. The yearly festival is celebrated during the December–January which lasts 28 days. The temple is administered by Travancore Devaswom Board.

Legend
As per Hindu legend, Bhagavathy is considered as the god of Kerala and protector of masses. It is believed that Parvathi, the consort of Shiva, came here after marrying him in the Himalayas. Parvathi got her menstrual period for 28 days. Bhagavathy is thus considered a reincarnation of Sati, where her Kamakhya Temple fell in the North. Another variant of the same legend indicates that sage Agasthya, who could not witness the sacred marriage of Shiva and Parvathi was visited by the pair after the marriage. Since Parvathi was in her menstrual period, she waited for 28 days to give darshan to the sage.

Architecture

The temple is located in the heart of Chengannur town, very close from Pamba River flowing towards the east. Chengannur is considered one of the 32 Namboothri villages in Kerala. Mahadeva is believed to be the god of the village. The presiding deity is Mahadeva, in the form of Lingam faces east, while the image of his consort, Bhagavathy is located exactly behind facing West. The temple is approached through a temple tower built in Kerala style and a golden flagstaff, both of which are axial to the central shrine. There are shrines of other deities around the temple in the second precinct for Sastha and Neela Greevan, while an image of Ganapathy is seen in the first precinct. The image of Bhagavathy is made of panchaloha, an alloy of five metals. It is believed that Perumachuten brought the image to the temple.

The temple is built in Kerala style architecture, which is common in all temples in the South Indian state of Kerala. The temple has a two storeyed gopuram or a gateway tower, with the upper storey having wooden trails covering the Kottupura (a hall of drum beating during festivals). A rectangular wall around the temple, called Kshetra-Madilluka pierced by the gateways, encloses all the shrines of the temple. The metal plated flagpost or Dwajasthambam is located axial to the temple tower leading to the central sanctum and there is a Deepastamba, which is the light post. Chuttuambalam is the outer pavilion within the temple walls. The central shrine and the associated hall is located in a rectangular structure called Nallambalam. Between the entrance of Nallambalam to the sanctum, there is a raised square platform called Namaskara Mandapa which has a pyramidal roof. Thevrapura, the kitchen used to cook offering to the deity is located on the left of Namaskara Mandapa from the entrance. Balithara is an altar is used for making ritualistic offering to demi-gods and the festive deities. The central shrine called Sreekovil houses the image of the presiding deity. It is on an elevated platform with a single door reached through a flight of five steps. Either sides of the doors have images of guardian deities called Dvarapalakas. As per Kerala rituals, only the main priest called Thantri and the second priest called Melshanthi alone can enter the Sree Kovil. The central shrine has a circular plan with the base built of granite, superstructure built of laterite and conical roof made of terracotta tile supported from inside by a wooden structure. The lower half of Sree Kovil consists of the basement, the pillar or the wall, called stambha or bhithi and the entablature called prasthara in the ratio 1:2:1, in height. Similarly the upper half is divided into the neck called griva, the roof tower called shikhara and the finial kalasam (made of copper) in the same ratio. The roof projects in two levels to protect the inner structure from heavy rains during monsoon. The roof of the temple and some of the pillars have lavish wood and stucco carvings depicting various stories of ancient epics, Ramayana and Mahabharatha.

Festival and worship practises

There are five daily poojas done in temple, three Sarabalies for Shiva and three for Bhagavathy. Tantric worship is done by Thazhaman.  The temple celebrates a rare menstruation festival for Bhagavathy, called Thripputhu, during when the temple is closed for three days during the irregular menstruation of the deity. The appearance of stain in the white garment is considered an aspect of devotion. As per accounts of the temple officials, in modern times, the feature is observed once in three or four months, while it was regularly observed during the olden times. The ceremony usually resembles the puberty ceremony of high class girls in Kerala. The sreekoil is closed during three days and opened after performing purification ceremony during the fourth day.

Thiruppooth Aratt is a festival celebrated in the temple at least thrice a year when the festival images of Mahadeva and Bhagavathy is taken in a procession on decorated elephants to the Pamba River. A holy dip, called Arat is offered to the images and the decorated images are taken back to the temple. Women devotees carry the traditional Thalappoli’ lamps during the procession. The procession is accompanied by temple orchestra and panchavadyam. The major festivals in the temple are flag hoisting on the Thiruvathirai month of Dhanu and Aaratu during the Thiruvathirai month of Makaram. The yearly festival is celebrated during the December–January which lasts 28 days.

See also

 Temples of Kerala
 Temple festivals of Kerala

References

External links

Shiva temples in Kerala
Hindu temples in Alappuzha district
108 Shiva Temples